Yang Hu (羊祜, 221 – 27 December 278), courtesy name Shuzi, was a Chinese military general and politician who lived during the Jin dynasty of China. His advocacy for plans to conquer the rival state of Eastern Wu finally persuaded Emperor Wu to carry them out, but he did not live to see the plans implemented. He was known for his humility and foresight. Chen Shou, who wrote the Records of the Three Kingdoms, described him as a man of medium height with fine eyebrows and a beautiful beard. Yang Hu is depicted in the Wu Shuang Pu (無雙譜, Table of Peerless Heroes) by Jin Guliang.

Life
Both Yang Hu's grandfather Yang Xu and father Yang Dao were commandery administrators (of Nanyang and Shangdang respectively), and his mother was a daughter of the Han dynasty historian and musician Cai Yong. His full elder sister Yang Huiyu was Sima Shi's third wife, subsequently honoured as an empress dowager after Emperor Wu established the Jin dynasty in February 266.

Yang Hu lost his father at age 11. He was raised by his uncle Yang Dan and served his uncle faithfully. As he matured, he became known for his intelligence, knowledge, and physical beauty. The general Xiahou Wei became impressed with him and married his niece (Xiahou Ba's daughter) to Yang Hu. After his father-in-law defected to Shu Han in 249 in light of Sima Yi's coup against Cao Shuang, Yang Hu was one of the few who were related by marriage who still dared to associate with the Xiahou clan. He served as a low level official during the reigns of the Cao Wei emperors Cao Mao and Cao Huan. 

Due to the advice of his aunt, Xin Xianying, Yang Hu raised his status. He warned Sima Zhao of Zhong Hui's intentions, and Sima Zhao trusted his judgement greatly after Zhong Hui rebelled (as he predicted) in March 264. After this, he went on to serve as an executive secretary for Sima Zhao.

After Sima Zhao's death in 265, his son Sima Yan succeeded him, and in February of the following year forced Cao Huan to abdicate in favour of him, ending Cao Wei and establishing the Jin dynasty (as Emperor Wu). Emperor Wu wanted to make Yang Hu a duke, but the latter declined.

Throughout the early part of Emperor Wu's reign, Yang Hu was one of the few key officials who strenuously advocated for the conquest of the rival state Eastern Wu. Emperor Wu, who liked the strategies that Yang Hu submitted, had him take charge of the western border with Eastern Wu and stationed him at Xiangyang. In 272, Yang Hu participated in a failed mission to rescue the Eastern Wu defector Bu Chan from Xiling (西陵; in present-day Yichang, Hubei), and was temporarily demoted, but was soon restored to his rank. After that defeat, he set up a détente with the Eastern Wu general Lu Kang and treated the Eastern Wu border residents with kindness, with intent to win over their loyalty. His efforts succeeded, though Lu Kang attempted to counter with his own gestures of goodwill. After Lu Kang's death in 274, the Eastern Wu border residents became increasingly impressed with the Jin dynasty in light of Yang Hu's kindness.

By 277, Yang Hu had fallen ill. While his plans of conquest had already been submitted and accepted by Emperor Wu, they were not ready for implementation. He performed his final act in the service of the empire – by recommending the capable Du Yu to succeed him. Du Yu would eventually go on to be a major part of the campaign against Eastern Wu. He died in December 278, just a few months after his elder sister Yang Huiyu. The people of Xiangyang built a monument for Yang Hu on Mount Xian, and ever after Yang Hu's death, visitors to the monument often wept in memory of his benevolent governance, and so the monument became known as the "Monument of Tears". After the Jin dynasty conquered Eastern Wu in 280, Emperor Wu had the declaration of victory read at Yang Hu's shrine, and awarded his wife, Lady Xiahou, an estate of over 5,000 taxable households in appreciation.

See also
 Lists of people of the Three Kingdoms

Notes

References

sources 
 Chen, Shou (3rd century). Records of the Three Kingdoms (Sanguozhi).
 Fang, Xuanling (ed.) (648). Book of Jin (Jin Shu).
 
 Pei, Songzhi (5th century). Annotations to Records of the Three Kingdoms (Sanguozhi zhu).
 Sima, Guang (1084). Zizhi Tongjian.

221 births
278 deaths
Cao Wei politicians
Jin dynasty (266–420) generals
Jin dynasty (266–420) politicians
Legendary Chinese people
Political office-holders in Hubei